Juan Eusebio Oiarzabal Urteaga (born 30 March 1956), commonly known as Juanito Oiarzabal, is a noted Spanish Basque mountaineer. He has written four books on the subject. He was the sixth man to reach all 14 eight-thousander summits, and the third one to reach them without supplementary oxygen. He was the first person to conquer the top three summits twice (Everest + K2 + Kangchenjunga) and was the oldest climber to summit Kangchenjunga, at almost 53, until Carlos Soria Fontan did so in 2014, at 75 years old. 
In 2004, he lost all his toes to frostbite after summiting K2.

In 2009, he announced wanting to become the first person in history to reach a "double 14", summiting each 8000er twice. In April 2010 he reached 24 eight-thousanders, after climbing Annapurna, a world record. In 2011 he climbed Lhotse for a second time, which was his 25th eight-thousander. He is second all-time for 8000er ascents behind Nepali climber Phurba Tashi Sherpa, who has 30.

The Himalayas 

His success in the Himalayas is well-known, but less well known is that before starting on those ascents he had already accumulated a curriculum which is among the best of Spain. He undertook ascents on all the Spanish mountain masses, on the hardest routes.  He even discovered some routes of great relevance. He is highly experienced in climbing the Alps, undertaking climbs for the technical challenges they presented. In other continents, he has climbed in North America, South America and Africa and returning to the Himalayas, it is here that he carries out his expeditions with the greatest ease, which may seem obvious after 35 expeditions over 23 years.

Mountaineering curriculum

Alaska 
 1984 – Denali ( known also as McKinley)  – West Buttress Route.

Argentina 
 1983 – Aconcagua – 5th world winter ascent (he has accredited 16 ascents to the Aconcagua, as a "guide").

Kenya 
 1988 – Mount Kenya – Diamond Corridor.

Nepal 
 1982 – Kangchuntse (Makalu II). Altitude reached: .
 1988 – Kangchenjunga. North side. Altitude reached: .
 1989 – Makalu. West Pillar. Altitude reached: .
 1990 – Everest. Southwest side. Altitude reached: .
 1991 – Kangchenjunga. North side. Altitude reached: .
 1993 – Everest. South-Southeast Route - crest. Summit.
 1995 – Makalu. Normal route. Summit.
 1995 – Lhotse. Normal Route. Summit.
 1996 – Kangchenjunga. North side. British route. Summit.
 1997 – Manaslu. Normal route. Summit.
 1998 – Dhaulagiri. Normal route. Summit.
 1999 – Annapurna. German route. Summit.
 2002 – Makalu. West pillar. Altitude reached: .
 2004 – Ama Dablam. Southwestern sharp edge. Summit.
 2010 – Annapurna. Summit (helicopter used on descent).
 2011 – Lhotse. Summit.

Pakistan 
 1987 – Gasherbrum II. Summit.
 1987 – Hidden Peak. Messner route. Altitude reached: .
 1992 – Nanga Parbat. Kinshofer route. Summit.
 1994 – K2 - Chogori. Tomo Cesen route (1st integral). Summit.
 1995 – Broad Peak. Normal route. Summit.
 1997 – Hidden Peak. Japanese Corridor. Summit.
 2003 – Broad Peak. Winter. Altitude reached: .
 2003 – Gasherbrum II. Normal route. Summit.
 2003 – Hidden Peak. Japanese Corridor. Summit.
 2004 – K2 - Chogori. Summit.

China 
 1985 – Cho-Oyu. Normal route. Summit.
 1998 – Shisha Pangma. Southwest side. British route. Summit.
 2000 – Everest. North side. Altitude reached:  (without O2).
 2001 – Everest. North side. Summit (without O2).
 2002 – Cho-Oyu. Normal route. Summit.
 2003 – Cho-Oyu. Normal route. Summit (23 September). 
 2003 – Cho-Oyu. Normal route. Summit (5 October).

China (autonomous region of  Xinjiang) 
 2000 – Taklamakan  desert crossing, (desert, within the Gobi desert), only with the help of camels.

Greenland 
 2000 – Crossing between the localities of Narsasoak and Kangarlosoak on a sleigh, pulled by a kite.

Russia 
 2001 – Mount Elbrus Normal route. Winter. The highest European summit.

Awards and distinctions
In his role as an expert, he has participated in several mountain rescue activities, receiving recognition for them.
He is a Member of Honour of different mountaineering clubs.
He is a Member of the Basque Mountaineering Club.
He is a climbing professor.
He is a professor of the Basque Mountaineering School (EVAM)
Mountaineering Guide, Member of the International Union of Mountaineering Guide Associations (UIAGM).
Golden Insignia from the Basque Mountaineering Federation.
Member of the "Comité de Patronage du Cinquantenaire de l'Annapurna" in 2000.
Member of Honor of the Spanish Geography Society.
Nominated for the "Prince of Asturias" Award for Sports in 1999.
Finalist for the "Prince of Asturias" Award for Sports in 2001.
According to the Mundo Deportivo newspaper, he is among the 20 most important Spanish sportsmen of the century.
Golden Medal for Sports Merit, awarded by the Spanish government in 1999.
On the proposal of the editors of  Basque jeans of communication, the Basque Government awarded him the distinction of Universal Basque Citizen in the year 2000.  That year the Jesuit, Ion Sobrino (standard-bearer of the freedom theology in El Salvador), also won the award, which had previously been won by Etxenike, Oteiza and Chillida.
 Member of Honour of the Spanish Exploration and Adventure Cub.
 The sports newspaper Marca awarded him its maximum prize:  Marca de Leyenda (Legendary Mark), a distinction that only a handful of elite sportsmen around the world have.
 In recognition of his sports achievements, he has been officially received by outstanding officials and personalities:  The Vitoria-Gasteiz City Council, Diputación Foral de Álava, the Lehendakari (Basque President), the former Spanish prime Minister (José María Aznar) and the King of Spain, Juan Carlos de Borbón.
 He was Guest of Honor at the activities organised by the French Government on the occasion of the 50th anniversary of the conquering of Annapurna, invited by its President Jacques Chirac.  He was also  a member of the activities Committee.
 In 2005 he was awarded the FCG International Award for Sports by the Fundación Cristóbal Gabarrón.

Books 

Juanito Oiarzabal has published four books:

Audiovisual productions 

He has undertaken 16 audiovisual productions that have been used to promote mountaineering, offering prestige to this sport at all levels and setting a high standard for both Vitoria-Gasteiz and Alava.
 On TVE, he filmed his ascent of Annapurna for the Al filo de lo imposible (On the Edge of the Impossible) television program.
He has also recorded many programs, such as the one he did on Everest, recreating the story of Mallory and Irvine who disappeared in 1924 while they tried to reach the summit.
 On the public Basque broadcasting corporation's ETB2 TV channel, he has featured as team leader in several instalments of The conqueror of the world's end, an adventure reality show located in Patagonia (Argentina).

References

External links 
 Juanito Oiarzabal's website

1956 births
Living people
Sportspeople from Vitoria-Gasteiz
Spanish mountain climbers
Summiters of all 14 eight-thousanders